Judith Hall may refer to:
Judith Hall (poet), American poet
Judith Elizabeth Hall, Welsh anaesthetist
 Judith Goslin Hall (born 1939), American and Canadian pediatrician, clinical geneticist and dysmorphologist